Peronoceras is genus of ammonite that lived during the middle Toarcian stage of early Jurassic. Members of this genus existed only in Fibulatum Subzone of Bifrons Zone. Their fossils were found in Europe, northern Africa, Asia, North America and South America.

Description
Form of their shell could range from depressed cadicone to compressed ellipsocone. Whorl section is quadrangular and has flat sides and venter. Ribs are present and they are fine to distant. They were always fibulate with the exception of inner whorls of finely ribbed species. On ventrolateral position, there were tubercules.

References

Dactylioceratidae
Toarcian life
Early Jurassic ammonites of Europe
Ammonites of Africa
Ammonites of Asia
Ammonites of North America
Ammonites of South America
Ammonitida genera